Aquapolis can refer to:

 The centerpiece structure of the 1975 World's Fair in Okinawa, Japan.
 An expansion set of the Pokémon Trading Card Game